Roberto Román Triguero (born 11 July 1985), known as Tito, is a Spanish professional footballer who plays as a right-back for RSD Alcalá.

Club career
Born in Madrid, Tito spent his first six years as a senior player in lowly clubs in his native region, also representing RCD Mallorca B in the Segunda División B and Tercera División. In August 2009, due to a clause in his contract which allowed him to leave for free if any Segunda División team required his services, he joined another side from the capital, Rayo Vallecano, for two seasons. He appeared in only ten games in his second year as they returned to La Liga after an eight-year absence, but subsequently became first choice.

Tito scored his first goal in the Spanish top flight on 7 April 2012, his team's last in a 6–0 home win over of CA Osasuna. He started in all of his 36 league appearances during the campaign, totaling 3,161 minutes of action as they managed to stay afloat.

On 20 December 2015, Tito and teammate Raúl Baena were sent off before the 30 minute mark of an eventual 10–2 away loss against Real Madrid. On 4 July 2016, after Rayo's top-tier relegation, the former signed a two-year deal with Granada CF. He was loaned to fellow league club CD Leganés the following 31 January, being bought outright on 6 June.

Tito returned to Rayo Vallecano on 29 July 2018, with the free agent signing a one-year contract.

References

External links

1985 births
Living people
Spanish footballers
Footballers from Madrid
Association football defenders
La Liga players
Segunda División players
Segunda División B players
Tercera División players
Tercera Federación players
RSD Alcalá players
RCD Mallorca B players
AD Alcorcón footballers
Rayo Vallecano players
Granada CF footballers
CD Leganés players